

Preseason 
The Phillies held spring training in Cape May, New Jersey from March 19, 1888, to March 30, 1888. When rain and snow barred outdoor work, Manager Harry Wright secured the use of the indoor Star Rink where the players practiced.

Regular season

Season standings

Record vs. opponents

Roster

Player stats

Batting

Starters by position 
Note: Pos = Position; G = Games played; AB = At bats; H = Hits; Avg. = Batting average; HR = Home runs; RBI = Runs batted in

Other batters 
Note: G = Games played; AB = At bats; H = Hits; Avg. = Batting average; HR = Home runs; RBI = Runs batted in

Pitching

Starting pitchers 
Note: G = Games pitched; IP = Innings pitched; W = Wins; L = Losses; ERA = Earned run average; SO = Strikeouts

Relief pitchers 
Note: G = Games pitched; W = Wins; L = Losses; SV = Saves; ERA = Earned run average; SO = Strikeouts

References 
1888 Philadelphia Quakers season at Baseball Reference

Philadelphia Phillies seasons
Philadelphia Quakers season
Philadelphia